Knema bengalensis is a species of plant in the family Myristicaceae. It is endemic to Bangladesh.
Its type was collected in the Chittagong District of Bangladesh, and in 1997 it was classed as vulnerable on the IUCN red list.

References

2006 IUCN Red List of Threatened Species.   Downloaded on 22 August 2007.

bengalensis
Vulnerable plants
Trees of Bangladesh
Endemic flora of Bangladesh
Taxonomy articles created by Polbot